Strawberry and Chocolate is a 1993 internationally co-produced film, directed by Tomás Gutiérrez Alea and Juan Carlos Tabío, based on the short story "The Wolf, The Forest and the New Man" (in Spanish, El Lobo, el bosque y el hombre nuevo) written by Senel Paz in 1990, who also wrote the screenplay for the film.

Plot 
The story takes place in Havana, Cuba in 1979. David (Vladimir Cruz), is rejected by Vivian, who marries an older and wealthier man. It is revealed that he is a university student when he meets Diego (Jorge Perugorría), a gay artist unhappy with the Castro regime's attitude toward the LGBT community as well as the censored conceptualization of culture. David's homophobic classmate, Miguel (Francisco Gattorno), plans to use David to spy on Diego, a person whom they see as aberrant and dangerous to the Communist cause; Diego, for his part, initiates the friendship with sexual intentions, but David for the most part rejects his advances.

Although David initially chafes at the idea of being Diego's "baby", he decides to do so in order to relay information back to Miguel. The two form a tenuous friendship in the process of this spying, and David makes it clear that their relationship will be platonic. Nancy, a "vigilance" who lives above Diego, attempts suicide as David arrives one day, and he ends up donating blood so that she can recover. As David spends more and more time with Diego, he argues with him about Communism, sexuality, and what is truly revolutionary. After constantly reporting their activities to Miguel, David eventually ends up erupting, telling Miguel that Diego has principles despite his sexuality. Vivian tries to reconnect with David and begin an affair, but he finally rejects her advances. David begins to show more signs of affection for Diego, buying him flowers and posting up Marxist icons in Diego's room, and letting him read his manuscript.

In a side plot, Diego and German, his artist protege and sexual partner, are unable to exhibit their full collection of work. In this process, the two have a falling out and Diego sends an angry letter to the museum curators of Cuba. This leads to his firing, and an inability to find work outside of manual labor due to his blacklisting by the government. Diego tells this to Nancy, who has developed a romantic interest in David. In a gesture of friendship to both parties, he decides to set Nancy and David up, and David loses his virginity to Nancy.  In the days after, Miguel comes to Diego's apartment, accusing David of being a homosexual.

Diego eventually decides to leave the country, but is unable to keep it a secret from David. He confesses his love for David, and reveals it was the fact that Diego didn't deny rumors that he was in a relationship with David that led to David's false "outing" as a gay man. Despite this, David embraces Diego with a hug, leaving their future relationship ambiguous.

Cast
Jorge Perugorría ...  Diego
Vladimir Cruz ...  David
Mirta Ibarra ...  Nancy
Francisco Gattorno ...  Miguel
Joel Angelino ...  German
Marilyn Solaya ...  Vivian
Andrés Cortina ...  Santeria priest
Antonio Carmona ...  Boyfriend

Reception 
Chicago Sun-Times film critic Roger Ebert comments that "nothing unfolds as we expect. Strawberry and Chocolate is not a movie about the seduction of a body, but about the seduction of a mind. It is more interested in politics than sex — unless you count Sexual Politics, since to be homosexual in Cuba is to make an anti-authoritarian statement whether you intend it or not."

The title refers to a comment made by Diego that immediately proves to David that Diego is gay when at Havana's Coppelia (ice cream parlor) he chooses strawberry ice cream even though chocolate (vastly more popular) is available.

Awards and nominations

Won
1995
 Goya Award for Best Spanish-Language Foreign Film (Mejor Película Extranjera de Habla Hispana)
 Premio ACE awards: Cinema—Best Film, Cinema—Best Director, Cinema—Best Actor (Perugorría), and Cinema—Best Supporting Actor (Cruz)
 Sundance Film Festival: Special Jury Prize:Special Mention

1994
 44th Berlin International Film Festival: Silver Berlin Bear—Special Jury Prize, Teddy—Best Feature Film
 Gramado Film Festival (Brazil): Audience Award, Kikito Critics Prize, and Golden Kikito awards in the categories of Best Latin Film, Best Actor (tie between Cruz and Perugorría), and Best Supporting Actress (Ibarra)

1993
 Havana Film Festival: Grand Coral—First Prize, Audience Award, FIPRESCI Prize, OCIC Award, ARCI-NOVA Award, and the categories of Best Direction, Best Actor (Perugorría), Best Actress (Luisina Brando), Best Supporting Actress (Ibarra), and Best Screenplay.

Nominated
 Academy Award for Best Foreign Language Film, 1994
 Golden Berlin Bear, 1994 Berlin International Film Festival

See also 
 List of Cuban films
 Gay rights in Cuba
 List of submissions to the 67th Academy Awards for Best Foreign Language Film
 List of Cuban submissions for the Academy Award for Best Foreign Language Film

References

External links

Rotten Tomatoes' links to reviews of the film

1994 films
1994 comedy-drama films
1990s Spanish-language films
Films set in the 1970s
Films set in Cuba
Films shot in Cuba
Mexican LGBT-related films
Cuban LGBT-related films
Films directed by Tomás Gutiérrez Alea
Films directed by Juan Carlos Tabío
Best Foreign Film in the Spanish Language Goya Award Winners
Silver Bear Grand Jury Prize winners
1990s Mexican films